Bearsdale is an unincorporated community in Hickory Point Township, Macon County, Illinois, United States. Platted in May 1892 for Samuel E. Bear, owner of the SE quarter of section 30, Hickory Point Township.

References

Unincorporated communities in Macon County, Illinois
Unincorporated communities in Illinois